Olympia Louise Campbell is a British fashion model. She was on the cover of Vogue Italia with her sister Edie.

Early life
Campbell was born in Westminster, to architect and British Vogue editor Sophie Hicks and hedge fund manager Roddy Campbell. Her older sister is fashion model Edie Campbell. Campbell attended City of London School for Girls.

Career
Campbell has walked for Louis Vuitton, Sonia Rykiel, Burberry, Simone Rocha, Céline, Balmain, Chanel, Fendi, Emilio Pucci, Christopher Kane, Hermès, Paco Rabanne, Ralph Lauren, and Acne Studios.

Campbell is a feminist. She has spoken out about sexual harassment by fashion photographers.

Personal life 
Campbell is a student of Human Sciences at University College London.

References

1995 births
Living people
English female models
People from Westminster
Models from London
British feminists
People educated at the City of London School for Girls